The Spanish Cockpit is a personal account of the Spanish Civil War written by Franz Borkenau and published in late 1937. It was based on his two wartime visits to Spain in August 1936 and January 1937, visiting Barcelona, Madrid, Toledo, Valencia, and the Aragon and Andalusia fronts. The book brought Borkenau international fame. After writing a positive review of the book, describing the book as the best on the civil war, George Orwell became a personal friend of the author's and the two remained politically close.

References

Bibliography

Further reading 

 
 
 
 
 
 
  Reprinted in

External links 

 
 Excerpt printed in The Essential Works of Anarchism (1972)

1937 non-fiction books
Books about anarchism
Faber and Faber books
Spanish Civil War books
English-language books